The 1995 Soul Train Music Awards was held on March 13, 1995, at the Shrine Auditorium in Los Angeles, California. The show honored the best in R&B, soul, rap, jazz, and gospel music from the previous year. The show was hosted by Anita Baker, Babyface, and Patti LaBelle.

Special awards

Heritage Award for Career Achievement
 Diana Ross

Sammy Davis Jr. Award for Entertainer of the Year
 Queen Latifah

Winners and nominees
Winners are in bold text.

R&B/Soul Album of the Year – Male
 Barry White – The Icon Is Love
 Gerald Levert – Groove On
 Keith Sweat – Get Up on It
 Luther Vandross – Songs

R&B/Soul Album of the Year – Female
 Anita Baker – Rhythm of Love
 Aaliyah – Age Ain't Nothing but a Number
 Brandy – Brandy
 Me'Shell Ndegeocello – Plantation Lullabies

R&B/Soul Album of the Year – Group, Band or Duo
 Boyz II Men – II
 Blackstreet – Blackstreet
 Jodeci – Diary of a Mad Band
 Zhané – Pronounced Jah-Nay

Best R&B/Soul Single – Male
 R. Kelly – "Bump n' Grind"
 Babyface – "When Can I See You"
 Aaron Hall – "I Miss You"
 Barry White – "Practice What You Preach"

Best R&B/Soul Single – Female
 Anita Baker – "Body & Soul"
 Brandy – "I Wanna Be Down"
 Toni Braxton – "You Mean the World to Me"
 Janet Jackson – "Any Time, Any Place"

Best R&B/Soul Single – Group, Band or Duo
 Boyz II Men – "I'll Make Love to You"
 69 Boyz – "Tootsee Roll"
 Blackstreet – "Before I Let You Go"
 Bossman and Blakjak – "Much Love"

R&B/Soul or Rap Song of the Year
 Barry White – "Practice What You Preach"
 69 Boyz – "Tootsee Roll"
 Boyz II Men – "I'll Make Love to You"
 R. Kelly – "Bump n' Grind"

Best R&B/Soul or Rap Music Video
 Aaron Hall – "I Miss You"
 Anita Baker – "Body & Soul"
 Boyz II Men – "Let It Snow"
 Coolio – "Fantastic Voyage"

Best R&B/Soul or Rap New Artist
 Brandy
 69 Boyz
 Aaliyah
 Tanya Blount

Best Rap Album
 Snoop Doggy Dogg – Doggystyle
 Bone Thugs-N-Harmony – Creepin on ah Come Up
 Scarface – The Diary
 Warren G – Regulate...G Funk Era

Best Jazz Album
 Norman Brown – After the Storm
 Gerald Albright – Smooth
 Various Artists – A Tribute to Miles
 Joshua Redman Quartet – Moodswing

Best Gospel Album
 Sounds of Blackness – Africa to America: The Journey of the Drum
 Helen Baylor – The Live Experience
 Hezekiah Walker & the Fellowship Crusade Choir – Live in Atlanta at Morehouse College
 BeBe & CeCe Winans – Relationships

Performances
 Michael Jackson – "Dangerous" and "You Are Not Alone"
 Boyz II Men
 Brandy, Queen Latifah, MC Lyte and Yo-Yo – "I Wanna Be Down"
 Herbie Hancock
 Anita Baker – "Body and Soul"
 Patti LaBelle – "All This Love"
 Babyface – "When Can I See You"
 Diana Ross Tribute:
 Patti LaBelle – Medley: "Ain't No Mountain High Enough" / "Someday We'll Be Together" / "It's My Turn"
 Tanya Blount
 Gerald Levert and Eddie Levert
 Blackstreet
 Warren G – "This D.J."

External links
 Soul Train Music Awards 1995 Winners & Nominees

Soul Train Music Awards, 1995
Soul Train Music Awards
Soul
Soul
1995 in Los Angeles